US 1 (or the Overseas Highway) crosses the Ohio Key at approximately mile marker 39, between Missouri Key and Bahia Honda Key. Today it is also known as Sunshine Key, after a camping resort located there. The portion of the island south of U.S. Route 1 is protected as the Ohio Key National Wildlife Refuge.

Former name
It was once known as Little Duck Key, however the name Little Duck Key is currently used for a very small island about a mile (1.6 km) to the east that is the western terminus of the Seven Mile Bridge.

Flora and fauna
The oceanside area of Ohio Key has palm trees, buttonwood trees and mangrove trees, and bird watching occurs there.

References

Islands of the Florida Keys
Islands of Monroe County, Florida
Unincorporated communities in Monroe County, Florida
Islands of Florida
Unincorporated communities in Florida